The Hochwilde or Hohe Wilde is a mountain in the Ötztal Alps on the border between Tyrol, Austria, and South Tyrol, Italy.

References 
 Austrian Alpenverein 
 Alpenverein South Tyrol

External links 

Mountains of the Alps
Mountains of Tyrol (state)
Mountains of South Tyrol
Alpine three-thousanders
Ötztal Alps
Austria–Italy border
International mountains of Europe